General Sir Timothy Buchan Radford,  (born 23 February 1963) is a British Army officer who has served as Commander Allied Rapid Reaction Corps and as Deputy Commander Resolute Support Mission. He is  currently Deputy Supreme Allied Commander Europe as of April 2020.

Military career
Educated at Methodist College Belfast, Rugby School, Durham University (BA, Politics) and King's College London (MA, War Studies), Radford was commissioned into The Light Infantry in 1985. He spent four years in command appointments before joining the School of Infantry as an instructor in 1989. He attended Staff College, Camberley in 1995. On promotion to colonel in 2005 he was appointed as Assistant Director of Counter Terrorism and United Kingdom Operations at the Ministry of Defence. He went on to command 19 Light Brigade in 2008, during which he deployed as Commander of Task Force Helmand between April and October of that year and led the major offensive Operation Panther's Claw in Summer 2009. Before Panther's Claw, Radford clashed with Lieutenant Colonel Rupert Thorneloe, who argued that it was flawed in concept and that there were not enough British forces to hold the ground.

In January 2010 Radford was made Head of Overseas Operations in the Ministry of Defence and, on promotion to major general in November 2011, he assumed the position of Chief of Staff of the ISAF Joint Command in Kabul, Afghanistan. He took over as General Officer Force Troops Command in February 2013, and in this capacity he oversaw the operation to provide medical assistance for the Ebola outbreak in West Africa in 2014. On promotion to lieutenant general in July 2015 he was selected as Deputy Commander Resolute Support Mission, and then as Commander Allied Rapid Reaction Corps in July 2016. He was promoted to general and assumed the appointment of Deputy Supreme Allied Commander Europe on 2 April 2020.

Author Toby Harnden has described Radford, during his time as a Brigade commander in Afghanistan, as "a softly spoken, cerebral officer, [with] piercing blue eyes and an understated manner honed during years of operations in Northern Ireland and Iraq...a listener rather than a talker. His thoughtful, considered approach, [was] underpinned by great compassion "

Honours and decorations
Radford was appointed Member of the Order of the British Empire (MBE) in April 1994, and Officer of the Order of the British Empire (OBE) in the 2007 New Year Honours. He was awarded the Distinguished Service Order (DSO) in March 2010. Radford was appointed Companion of the Order of the Bath (CB) in the 2016 Birthday Honours. On 23 November 2018, Radford was awarded the US Legion of Merit with the degree of officer. He was appointed Knight Commander of the Order of the Bath (KCB) in the 2021 Birthday Honours.

References

Sources

External links

|-

|-
 

|-

1963 births
Living people
Graduates of the Staff College, Camberley
People educated at Rugby School
Alumni of St Chad's College, Durham
Alumni of King's College London
British Army generals
Companions of the Distinguished Service Order
Officers of the Order of the British Empire
Knights Commander of the Order of the Bath
Recipients of the Commendation for Valuable Service
The Light Infantry officers
Radford